David Bezdička (born 9 July 1996) is a Czech football player who plays for German club SpVgg SV Weiden.

Club career
He signed for Žižkov in the winter break of the 2019–20 season after being released by Dukla Prague.

References

External links
 
 

1996 births
Living people
Czech footballers
Association football forwards
FK Dukla Prague players
TJ Jiskra Domažlice players
FK Teplice players
FK Viktoria Žižkov players
Czech First League players
Czech National Football League players
Bohemian Football League players
Bayernliga players
Czech expatriate footballers
Expatriate footballers in Germany
Czech expatriate sportspeople in Germany